The 2011 Harvard Crimson football team represented Harvard University in the 2011 NCAA Division I FCS football season. The Crimson were led by 18th-year head coach Tim Murphy and played their home games at Harvard Stadium. They were a member of the Ivy League. They finished the season 9–1 overall and 7–0 in Ivy League play to claim the conference championship. Harvard averaged 12,707 fans per game.

Schedule

References

Harvard
Harvard Crimson football seasons
Ivy League football champion seasons
Harvard Crimson football
Harvard Crimson football